Eupithecia hundamoi is a moth in the family Geometridae. It is found in Korea.

References

Moths described in 1978
hundamoi
Moths of Asia